Eichstadt is a lunar impact crater that is located in the eastern section of the Montes Cordillera range that encircles the Mare Orientale impact basin. It lies toward the southwestern limb of the Moon, and so appears oblong when viewed from the Earth due to foreshortening. Over 200 kilometers to the east of Eichstadt are the craters Darwin and Lamarck, and to the south is Krasnov.

The rim of this crater is well-defined and forms a somewhat uneven circle. There are slight outward bulges in the perimeter to the south-southeast, southwest, and to the north. There are some terraces along the inner wall and the top edge is slumped. In the central part of the interior floor is a cluster of low, rugged ridges.

The crater is named after German mathematician and astronomer Lorentz Eichstadt.

Satellite craters
By convention these features are identified on lunar maps by placing the letter on the side of the crater midpoint that is closest to Eichstadt.

References

 
 
 
 
 
 
 
 
 
 
 
 

Impact craters on the Moon